E sharp may refer to:

 E♯ (musical note) (see also E-sharp minor and F major)
 eSharp, a British research journal
 E!Sharp, a Brussels-based EU affairs magazine
 E Sharp (band), an Indie Rock band from Karachi, Sindh, Pakistan